12th AFCA Awards

Best Film: 
Moonlight

The 12th Austin Film Critics Association Awards, honoring the best in filmmaking for 2016, were announced on December 28, 2016.

Winners and nominees

References

External links
 IMDb page
 Official website

2016 film awards
2016
2016 in Texas